1961–62 Kuwaiti Premier League was the inaugural season of the First League Division.

Overview
The first season of the Kuwaiti League officially started after the closure of the old clubs and the opening of a new football activity, with the participation of seven new teams between clubs and schools, namely (Al-Arabi, Al-Qadsia, Al-Kuwait, Thanwit Kifan, Thanwit Al-Shoike, Al-Kalia Al-Saneia and Al-Shorta). The first home-and-away system was held, and Al-Arabi was able to register his name as the first club to win the league championship without drawing or losing by 7 points from Al-Qadsia (Perfect season), scoring 42 goals and conceding only 10 goals.

League table

References
RSSSF

Kuwait Premier League seasons
Kuwait
football